Qadr may refer to:

 Qadr (munition)
 Qadr (doctrine)
 Al-Qadr (sura)
 Laylat al-Qadr